Abalone shriveling syndrome-associated virus was described in 2010 from an abalone which had died from abalone shriveling syndrome.


Genome
The genome is double stranded circular DNA with 34,952 base pairs and encodes 28 putative open reading frames. The G+C content of the genome is 39.5%. The functions of several of these proteins is known: these include the terminase, endonuclease, exonuclease, resolvase, helicase, primase and single-stranded binding protein. Seven other proteins appear to be structural in nature (head/tail proteins). Another protein encoded by the genome is thymidylate kinase. The remaining proteins have no known homologs and their function remains unknown.

Virology
The disease caused by this virus was first noted in cultivated abalone in China in 1999. Since then there has been an epidemic of continuous outbreaks of this disease.

The virus is spread in the water. It is released from the dead or dying abalones and ingested by the abalone while feeding.

References

Double-stranded DNA viruses
Unaccepted virus taxa
Animal viral diseases